Ryhill is a civil parish in the metropolitan borough of the City of Wakefield, West Yorkshire, England.  The parish contains two listed buildings that are recorded in the National Heritage List for England.  Both the listed buildings are designated at Grade II, the lowest of the three grades, which is applied to "buildings of national importance and special interest".  The parish contains the village of Ryhill and the surrounding area, and the listed buildings consist of a well head and a farmhouse.


Buildings

References

Citations

Sources

Lists of listed buildings in West Yorkshire